Sociological imagination is a term used in the field of sociology to describe a framework for understanding social reality that places personal experiences within a broader social and historical context.

It was coined by American sociologist C. Wright Mills in his 1959 book The Sociological Imagination to describe the type of insight offered by the discipline of sociology. Today, the term is used in introductory sociology textbooks to explain the nature of sociology and its relevance in daily life.

Definitions
In The Sociological Imagination, Mills attempts to reconcile two different and abstract concepts of social reality: the "individual" and the "society." Accordingly, Mills defined sociological imagination as "the awareness of the relationship between personal experience and the wider society."

In exercising their sociological imagination, one seeks to understand situations in the individual's life by looking at situations in broader society. For example, a single student who fails to keep up with the academic demands of college and ends up dropping out may be perceived to have faced personal difficulties or faults; however, when one considers that around 50% of college students in the United States fail to graduate, we can understand this one student's trajectory as part of a larger social issue. It is not about claiming that any outcome has entirely personal or entirely social causes, rather, it is about highlighting the connections between the two.

Later sociologists have different perspectives on the concept, but they share some overlapping themes.

Sociological imagination is an outlook on life that involves an individual developing a deep understanding of how their biography is a result of historical process and occurs within a larger social context. As per Anthony Giddens, the term is:

 The application of imaginative thought to the asking and answering of sociological questions. Someone using the sociological imagination "thinks himself away" from the familiar routines of daily life.

There is an urge to know the historical and sociological meaning of the singular individual in society, particularly within their time period. To do this, one may use the sociological imagination to better understand the larger historical scene in terms of its meaning for an individual's inner self and external career. The sociological imagination can be seen practiced if one reflects on their history for all past events have led up to the present, mostly following the same pattern. Mills argued that history is an important element in sociological imagination. These different historical events have shaped modern society as a whole and each individual within it. It allows a person to see where their life is at compared to others, based on past experiences. Mills argues that one can only truly understand themselves if they can truly understand their circumstances.

Another perspective is that Mills chose sociology because he felt it was a discipline that "could offer the concepts and skills to expose and respond to social injustice." He eventually became disappointed with his profession of sociology because he felt it was abandoning its responsibilities, which he criticized in The Sociological Imagination. In some introductory sociology classes, Mills' characterization of the sociological imagination is presented as a critical quality of mind that can help individuals "to use information and to develop reason in order to achieve lucid summations of what is going on in the world and of what may be happening within themselves."

Real-life application

Lack of sociological imagination
Social imagination allows one to make more self-aware decisions, rather than be swayed by social norms or factors that may otherwise dictate actions. The lack of a sociological imagination can make people apathetic. This apathy expresses itself as a lack of indignation in scenarios dealing with moral horror—the Holocaust is a classic example of what happens when a society renders itself to the power of a leader and doesn't use sociological imagination. Social apathy can lead to accepting atrocities performed by leaders (political or familiar) and the lack of ability to react morally to their leaders' actions and decisions. The Holocaust was based on the principle of absolute power in a dictatorship, where society fell victim to apathy and willingly looked away from the horrors they committed. They willfully accepted the decisions taken by Adolf Hitler and carried out the orders because they had lost self-awareness and moral code, adopting the new social moral code. In doing this, they lost the ability to morally react to Hitler's command and in turn slaughtered more than 6,000,000 Jews, other minorities, and disabled persons.

Uses in films
Those who teach courses in social problems report using films to teach about war, to aid students in adopting a global perspective, and to confront issues of race relations. There are benefits of using film as part of a multimedia approach to teaching courses in popular culture. It provides students of medical sociology with case studies for hands-on observational experiences. It acknowledges the value of films as historical documentation of changes in cultural ideas, materials, and institutions.

Feature films are used in introductory sociology courses to demonstrate the current relevance of sociological thinking, and how the sociological imagination helps people understand their social world. As a familiar medium, films help students connect their own experiences to broader theory. The underlying assumption is that the sociological imagination is best developed and exercised in introductory classes by placing course material in the context of conflict theory and functionalism.

Using the sociological imagination to analyze feature films is somewhat important to the average sociological standpoint, but more important is the fact that this process develops and strengthens the sociological imagination as a tool for understanding. Sociology and filmmaking go hand-in-hand because of the potential for viewers to react differently to the same message and theme; this creates room to debate these different interpretations.

For example, imagine a film that introduces a character from four different angles and situations in life, each of which draws upon social, psychological, and moral standards to form a central ideal that echoes the narrative outcome, the reasoning behind individuals' actions, and the story's overall meaning. Through watching this film, discussions may take place amongst viewers (such as about the entertainment satisfaction, or the interpretations of the film's themes). In these discussions, plot points are made, conclusions are drawn upon, and societal problems and situations are addressed. Viewers may determine what is morally permissible or not, discuss beneficial and efficient ways to help people, and produce new ideas through correlating ideologies and aspects. This process strengthens sociological imagination because it can add sociological perspective to a viewer's state of mind.

Application in sociological studies
Mills created tips to help conduct valid and reliable sociological studies using sociological imagination: Be a good craftsman: Avoid any rigid set of procedures. Above all, seek to develop and to use the sociological imagination. Avoid the fetishism of method and technique. Urge the rehabilitation of the unpretentious intellectual craftsman, and try to become such a craftsman yourself. Let every man be his own methodologist; let every man be his own theorist; let theory and method again become part of the practice of a craft. Stand for the primacy of the individual scholar; stand opposed to the ascendancy of research teams of technicians. Be one mind that is on its own confronting the problems of man and society.
 Avoid the byzantine oddity of associated and disassociated Concepts, the mannerism of verbiage. Urge upon yourself and upon others the simplicity of clear statement. Use more elaborated terms only when you believe firmly that their use enlarges the scope of your sensibilities, the precision of your references, the depth of your reasoning. Avoid using unintelligibility as a means of evading the making of judgments upon society—and as a means of escaping your readers' judgments upon your own work.
 Make any trans-historical constructions you think your work requires; also delve into sub-historical minutiae. Make up quite formal theory and build models as well as you can. Examine in detail little facts and their relations, and big unique events as well. But do not be fanatic: relate all such work, continuously and closely, to the level of historical reality. Do not assume that somebody else will do this for you, sometime, somewhere. Take as your task the defining of this reality; formulate your problems in its terms; on its level try to solve these problems and thus resolve the issues and the troubles they incorporate. And never write more than three pages without at least having in mind a solid example.
 Do not study merely one small milieu after another; study the social structures in which milieux are organized. In terms of these studies of larger structures, select the milieux you need to study in detail, and study them in such a way as to understand the interplay of milieux with structure. Proceed in a similar way in so far as the span of time is concerned. Do not be merely a journalist, however a precise one. Know that journalism can be a great intellectual endeavor, but know also that yours is greater! So do not merely report minute researches into static knife-edge moments, or very short-term runs of time. Take as your time—span the course of human history, and locate within it the weeks, years, epochs you examine.
 Realize that your aim is a fully comparative understanding of the social structures that have appeared and that do now exist in world history. Realize that to carry it out you must avoid the arbitrary specialization of prevailing academic departments. Specialize your work variously, according to topic, and above all according to significant problem. In formulating and in trying to solve these problems, do not hesitate, indeed seek, continually and imaginatively, to draw upon the perspectives and materials, the ideas and methods, of any and all sensible studies of man and society. They are your studies; they are part of what you are a part of; do not let them be taken from you by those who would close them off by weird jargon and pretensions of expertise.
 Always keep your eyes open to the image of man—the generic notion of his human nature—which by your work you are assuming and implying; and also to the image of history—your notion of how history is being made. In a word, continually work out and revise your views of the problems of history, the problems of biography, and the problems of social structure in which biography and history intersect. Keep your eyes open to the varieties of individuality, and to the modes of epochal change. Use what you see and what you imagine, as the clues to your study of the human variety.
 Know that you inherit and are carrying on the tradition of classic social analysis; so try to understand man not as an isolated fragment, not as an intelligible field or system in and of itself. Try to understand men and women as historical and social actors, and the ways in which the variety of men and women are intricately selected and intricately formed by the variety of human societies. Before you are through with any piece of work, no matter how indirectly on occasion, orient it to the central and continuing task of understanding the structure and the drift, the shaping and the meanings, of your own period, the terrible and magnificent world of human society in the second half of the twentieth century.
 Do not allow public issues as they are officially formulated, or troubles as they are privately felt, to determine the problems that you take up for study. Above all, do not give up your moral and political autonomy by accepting in somebody else's terms the illiberal practicality of the bureaucratic ethos or the liberal practicality of the moral scatter. Know that many personal troubles cannot be solved merely as troubles, but must be understood in terms of public issues—and in terms of the problems of history-making. Know that the human meaning of public issues must be revealed by relating them to personal troubles—and to the problems of the individual life. Know that the problems of social science, when adequately formulated, must include both troubles and issues, both biography and history, and the range of their intricate relations. Within that range the life of the individual and the making of societies occur; and within that range the sociological imagination has its chance to make a difference in the quality of human life in our time.

Other theories 
Herbert Blumer, in his work Symbolic Interactionism: Perspective and Method, developed the idea of a non-standard look at the world, which helps social scientists understand and analyze the study area.

One can see the empirical world only through some scheme or image of it. The entire act of scientific study is oriented and shaped by the underlying picture of the empirical world that is used. This picture sets the selection and formulation of problems, the determination of what are data, the means to be used in getting the data, the kinds of relations sought between data, and the forms in which propositions are cast. In view of this fundamental and pervasive effect wielded on the entire act of scientific inquiry by the initiating picture of the empirical world, it is ridiculous to ignore this picture. The underlying picture of the world is always capable of identification in the form of a set of premises. These premises are constituted by the nature given either explicitly or implicitly to the key objects that comprise the picture. The unavoidable task of genuine methodological treatment is to identify and assess these premises.
Howard S. Becker, being a disciple of Blumer, continued to develop his idea of a particular look at the objects under study, and in 1998 wrote the book Tricks of the Trade: How to Think about Your Research While You're Doing It, wherein he gives a list of recommendations that may be useful in conducting sociological research. His main idea is to create a comprehensive picture of the object, phenomenon, or social group being studied. To this end, he proposes to pay particular attention to statistical and historical knowledge before conducting research; to use critical thinking, trying to create a universal picture of the world; and to make the result of the research understandable and acceptable for everyone.

Sociological perspective
The related term "sociological perspective" was coined by Peter L. Berger, describing it as seeing "the general in the particular," and as helping sociologists realize general patterns in the behavior of specific individuals. One can think of the sociological perspective as one's own personal choice and how society plays a role in shaping individuals' lives.

See also

Imaginary (sociology)
Sociological theory

References

 Sociological-Imagination.ORG. Retrieved 23 February 2012. 
 C. Wright Mills, "The Sociological Imagination". From Lemert

Further reading
Mills, C. W.: 1959, The Sociological Imagination, Oxford University Press, London.
 Michael Hughes, Carolyn J. Kroehler, James W. Vander Zanden. 'Sociology: The Core', McGraw-Hill,  Online chapter summary
 Judith Bessant and Rob Watts, 'Sociology Australia' (2nd ed), Allen & Unwin, 2001. 
 Laurie Gordy and Alexandria Peary, 'Bringing Creativity into the Classroom: Using Sociology to Write First-Person Fiction.' Teaching Sociology.  Vol. 33, 2005 (October: 396–402).
 Ray Jureidini and Marilyn Poole, 'Sociology' (3rd ed), Allen & Unwin 2002. 
 Joel Charon, 'Ten Questions: A Sociological Perspective', Fourth Edition. Wadsworth, 2000.
 Earl Babbie, 'The Practice of Social Research', 10th edition, Wadsworth, Thomson Learning Inc., 
 The Sociological Perspective: University of Missouri
 Giddens, Anthony. "Sociological Imagination." Introduction to Sociology . 1996. Karl Bakeman. New York: W. W. Norton & Company, Inc, 1996. Print. 
 
 Jon Frauley. 2010. Criminology, Deviance and the Silver Screen: The Fictional Reality and the Criminological Imagination. New York: Palgrave Macmillan.
 Jon Frauley (ed). 2015. C. Wright Mills and the Criminological Imagination. Farnham, UK: Ashgate Publishing.

External links
A Mills Revival? by S. Aronowitz
Contemporary Analysis of C. Wright Mills
On Intellectual Craftsmanship from Sociological Imagination (pdf mirror)
 https://archive.today/20140207205636/https://www.csupomona.edu/~plin/EWS375/The%20Sociological%20Imagination.htm
Sociological Imagination in life events
Sociology, 10/e  (out of print)

Sociological terminology